The Emerald Scepter is a fantasy novel by Thomas M. Reid, set in the world of the Forgotten Realms, and based on the Dungeons & Dragons role-playing game. It is the third novel in "The Scions of Arrabar" trilogy. It was published in paperback in August 2005.

Plot summary
An ally from the deepest forests comes to aid a city involved in the political intrigue of a mercenary society.

Reception
Don D'Ammassa opined that the novel's plot is the "most interesting" of the three in the trilogy, "although the prose is occasionally awkward."

References

2005 American novels

Forgotten Realms novels